MS Communications, LLC held low-power television licenses and construction permits in several U.S. states during the 2000s.  At one point MS Communications held the second-highest number of LPTV allocations in the United States, but nearly all of the stations remained unbuilt or dark.

Company president Mark Silberman said that he has intended to start a wireless cable service over LPTV, and had begun acquiring stations as early as 1992.  Most of the licenses were acquired in 2000, though direct-broadcast satellite television made the company's original plans obsolete.  By 2005, over 200 LPTV station licenses or construction permits were transferred to MS Communications, and MS Communications had the second-highest number of LPTV licenses in the United States, but no stations had operated with more than a test pattern.

After receiving information that stations were not operating and may not have even been constructed, the Federal Communications Commission demanded information on the status of MS Communications stations.  When no information was received, the FCC cancelled the licenses of 178 of the stations on October 28, 2010.  There were also 60 station licenses or construction permits that were transferred to Silberman but expired by 2018, and many of the MS Communications construction permits and licenses were set to expire in 2018.

Stations

Transferred
MS Communications transferred the following licenses and construction permits to others:

Went on the air

The following stations were sold and later went on the air under other owners:

October 2010 deletion letter

These 178 stations had their licenses or permits cancelled, and MS Communications was notified that they were deleted by the FCC on October 28, 2010, among other times, after MS Communications did not respond to FCC requests about the stations' operations:

References

Further reading
  Citations: DA-07-496; 22 FCC Rcd 2167 (4).  — Denied petitions for reconsideration and affirmed and dismissed displacement applications, file number BPTTL-20000327AAX et al.  Contains a list of 106 stations involved.

2000s in American television
Companies based in Los Angeles
Defunct television stations in the United States
Low-power broadcasting
Defunct mass media in Arkansas
Defunct mass media in California
Defunct mass media in Georgia (U.S. state)
Defunct mass media in Iowa
Defunct mass media in Illinois
Defunct mass media in Kentucky
Defunct mass media in Maine
Defunct mass media in Michigan
Defunct mass media in Missouri
Defunct mass media in Mississippi
Defunct mass media in Oklahoma
Defunct mass media in Tennessee
Defunct mass media in Wisconsin